"Out of My Head" is song by Canadian alternative rock band Mobile. It was released in February 2006 as the second single from their debut album Tomorrow Starts Today. The song reached number 6 in Canada.

MuchMusic Countdown
The music video reached number one on MuchMusic's Countdown in May 2006. The video fell down the countdown list after reaching number-one, but managed to reach number-one again in July 2006. This was a feat never achieved before on MuchMusic. Due to the video reclimbing the charts, Mobile set the record for the most weeks spent on the Countdown with a single video, at 22. It was the band's first number one video after "Montreal Calling" reached the top five in January of that year.

`

Chart positions

References

Mobile (band) songs
2006 singles